The commune of Giheta is a commune of Gitega Province in central Burundi. The capital lies at Giheta.

References

Communes of Burundi
Gitega Province